"Come Away Melinda" is a song written by Fred Hellerman and Fran Minkoff.   An anti-war song, its first release was by Harry Belafonte in May 1963.  The song was subsequently recorded by many other singers.

Recordings 
The song was first released by Harry Belafonte in May 1963, as the closing track on his album Streets I Have Walked.  It had been performed by The Weavers (including Hellerman) at their 15th anniversary concerts on May 2 and 3, 1963, which were issued later that year as  Reunion At Carnegie Hall, 1963.

Later recordings include those by Judy Collins (Judy Collins 3), Theodore Bikel (A Folksinger's Choice), Tim Rose (Tim Rose), Bobbie Gentry (Local Gentry), Uriah Heep (...Very 'Eavy ...Very 'Umble), Velvett Fogg (Velvett Fogg), UFO (UFO 1), Kenny Rankin (Mind-Dusters), The Big 3 (Live at the Recording Studio), The Mamas & The Papas (Monday Monday), John Miles, Cat's Eyes, and L.Stadt.

In the UK it was a number 47 hit for female singer Barry St. John in 1965.

References

The Weavers songs
Harry Belafonte songs
Judy Collins songs
Bobbie Gentry songs
Uriah Heep (band) songs
The Mamas and the Papas songs
1963 songs
Songs written by Fred Hellerman
Anti-war songs